Bandar Salama is a village on the island of Mohéli (Mwali) in the Comoros. According to the 1991 census, the village had a population of 679.

References

Populated places in Mohéli